is a Japanese 5-member female idol group, formed in May 2012. It is affiliated to the entertainment company Spiral Music.

Members

Discography

Singles

DVDs / Blu-ray Discs

Music videos

References

External links 
 
 Ultra Girl official blog (since 20 August 2013)
 
 Search query: "Ultra Girl" (ウルトラガール)

Japanese girl groups
Japanese idol groups
Musical groups established in 2012
2012 establishments in Japan
Victor Entertainment artists